The Australia national football team represents the country of Australia in international association football. It is fielded by Football Australia, the governing body of soccer in Australia, and competes as a member of the Asian Football Confederation (AFC), which encompasses the countries of Asia.

Australia have competed in numerous competitions, and all players who have played between four and nine, either as a member of the starting eleven or as a substitute, are listed below. Each player's details include his usual playing position while with the team, the number of caps earned and goals scored in all international matches, and details of the first and most recent matches played in. The names are initially ordered by date of debut, and then by alphabetical order.

Key

Players
All statistics are correct up to and including the match played on 27 January 2022.

See also
List of Australia international soccer players with one cap
List of Australia international soccer players (2–3 caps)
List of Australia international soccer players (10+ caps)

Notes

References
General
 
 

Specific

Lists of Australia international soccer players
Association football player non-biographical articles